Andrew George Tulloch (born 1 April 1967 in Wolverhampton) is a male retired English athlete who specialised in the 110 metres hurdles.

Athletics career
He represented Great Britain at the 1996 Summer Olympics, as well as three consecutive World Championships, starting in 1993. He represented England in the 110 metres hurdles event, at the 1994 Commonwealth Games in Victoria, British Columbia, Canada. Four years later he represented England in the 110 metres hurdles event again, at the 1998 Commonwealth Games in Kuala Lumpur, Malaysia.

He has personal bests of 13.49 seconds in the 110 metres hurdles (Oslo 1999) and 7.55 seconds in the 60 metres hurdles (Valencia 1998).

Competition record

References

1967 births
Living people
Sportspeople from Wolverhampton
English male hurdlers
Olympic athletes of Great Britain
Athletes (track and field) at the 1996 Summer Olympics
Commonwealth Games competitors for England
Athletes (track and field) at the 1994 Commonwealth Games
Athletes (track and field) at the 1998 Commonwealth Games
World Athletics Championships athletes for Great Britain